All India Radio (AIR), officially known since 1957 as Akashvani (literary meaning "Voice from the Sky"), is the national public radio broadcaster of India and is a division of Prasar Bharati. It was established in 1936.

It is the sister service of Prasar Bharati's Doordarshan, an Indian television broadcaster. Headquartered in the Akashvani Bhavan building in New Delhi, it houses the Drama Section, the FM Section, the National Service, and is also home to the Indian television station Doordarshan Kendra, (Delhi).

All India Radio is the largest radio network in the world, and one of the largest broadcasting organisations in the world in terms of the number of languages broadcast and the spectrum of socio-economic and cultural diversity it serves. AIR's home service comprises 420 stations located across the country, reaching nearly 92% of the country's area and 99.19% of the total population. AIR originates programming in 23 languages and 179 dialects.

Etymology

Ākāśavānī (आकाशवाणी) is a Sanskrit word meaning 'celestial announcement' or 'voice from the sky/heaven'. In Hinduism, Jainism and Buddhism, Akashvanis are often featured in stories as a medium of communication from heaven to mankind.

When the Indian State Broadcasting Service (ISBS) was renamed All India Radio, Rabindranath Tagore rechristened it as Akashvani, the voice that comes over from the skies, through a poem penned for the inauguration of Calcutta’s shortwave service.

'Akashvani' was also used in the context of radio by M. V. Gopalaswami in 1936 after setting up India's first private radio station in his residence, "Vittal Vihar" (about two hundred yards from AIR's current Mysore radio station). Akashvani was later given as All India Radio's on-air name in 1957; given its literal meaning in Sanskrit, it was believed to be a more than suitable name for a broadcaster.

History
 Broadcasting began in June 1923 during the British Raj with programmes by the Bombay Presidency Radio Club and other radio clubs. According to an agreement on 23 July 1927, the private Indian Broadcasting Company Ltd (IBC) was authorized to operate two radio stations: the Bombay station which began on 23 July 1927, and the Calcutta station which followed on 26 August 1927. The company went into liquidation on 1 March 1930. The government took over the broadcasting facilities and began the Indian State Broadcasting Service (ISBS) on 1 April 1930 on an experimental basis for two years, and permanently in May 1932 it then went on to become All India Radio on 8 June 1936.In August 1947, All India Radio hired its first female newsreader, Saeeda Bano, who read the news in Urdu.
On 1 October 1939, the External Service began with a broadcast in Pushtu. It was intended to counter radio propaganda from Germany directed at Afghanistan, Persia and Arab nations. 1939 also saw the opening of the Dhaka station of Eastern India, in what is now Bangladesh. This station catered and nurtured the pioneers of Bengali intellectuals. The foremost among them, Natyaguru Nurul Momen, became the trail-blazer of the talk-show in 1939. He wrote and directed the first modern radio-play for this station in 1942. When India became independent in 1947, the AIR network had only six stations (Delhi, Bombay, Kolkata, Madras, Lucknow, and Tiruchirappalli). The three radio stations at Lahore, Peshawar and Dhaka remained in what became Pakistan after the division. The total number of radio sets in India at that time was about 275,000. On 3 October 1957, the Vividh Bharati Service was launched, to compete with Radio Ceylon. Television broadcasting began in Delhi in 1959 as part of AIR, but was split off from the radio network as Doordarshan on 1 April 1976. FM broadcasting began on 23 July 1977 in Chennai, and expanded during the 1990s.

Deccan Radio (Nizam Radio 1932), the first radio station in Hyderabad State (now Hyderabad, India), went live on air on 3 February 1935. It was launched by Mir Osman Ali Khan the seventh Nizam of Hyderabad with a transmitting power of 200 Watts. On 1 April 1950, Deccan Radio was taken over by the Indian Government, and in 1956 it was merged with All India Radio (AIR). Since then, it has been known as AIR-Hyderabad (100 kW).

Domestic services
AIR has many services in a number of languages, each serving different regions across India.

Vividh Bharati
Vividh Bharati is one of the best-known services of All India Radio. Its name roughly translates as "Diverse Indian". It is also known as the Commercial Broadcasting Service or CBS. Commercially, it is the most accessible AIR network and is popular in Mumbai and other large cities. Vividh Bharati offers a wide range of programmes including news, film music, short plays, music and comedy. It operates on different medium wave-band as well as FM frequencies in each city. Vividh Bharati service started in 1957.

Some programmes broadcast on Vividh Bharati are:
 Hawa-mahal: Radio plays based on novels and plays
 Santogen ki mehfil: Comedy
 Aaj ke fankar: description of life and works of a film artist
 Chhayageet: songs of announcer's choice with impeccable scripting

Central Sales Unit
Central Sales Unit (CSU) is single window services of All India Radio for commercial purposes. Its name roughly translates as "Centralised Sales Unit". It is situated in Mumbai. http://prasarbharati.gov.in/AIRCSUContact.php

Other services
 Primary Channel
 National Channel

Regional services
The headquarters of the Regional Deputy Directors General are located in Delhi and Chandigarh (NR), Lucknow and Bhopal (CR), Guwahati (NER), Kolkata (ER), Mumbai and Ahmedabad (WR), Chennai and Bangalore (SR). All frequencies are in kHz, unless otherwise noted. Most of the channels are also available online.

External services
The external services of All India Radio are broadcast in 27 languages to countries outside India via high-power shortwave band broadcasts. Medium wave is also used to reach neighbouring countries. In addition to broadcasts targeted at specific countries by language, there is a General Overseas Service broadcasting in English with  hours of programming each day aimed at a general international audience. The external broadcasts were begun on 1 October 1939 by the British government to counter the propaganda of the Nazis directed at the Afghan people. The first broadcasts were in Pashto, beamed to Afghanistan and the North-West Frontier Province. Broadcasts soon began in other languages including: Dari, Persian, Arabic, English, Burmese, Japanese, Chinese, Malay and French. The external services broadcast in 16 foreign and 11 Indian languages, with a total programme output of 70¼ hours per day on medium and shortwave frequencies.

Two high powered FM stations of All India Radio are being installed in Amritsar and Fazilka in the Punjab to supplement the programmes broadcast from transmitters operating from Jalandhar, New Delhi, Chandigarh and Mumbai and to improve the broadcast services during unfavourable weather conditions in the border regions of Punjab.

Today, the External Services Division of All India Radio broadcasts daily with 57 transmissions with almost 72 hours or programming covering over 108 countries in 27 languages, of which 15 are foreign and 12 Indian. The foreign languages are: Arabic, Baluchi, Burmese, Chinese, Dari, French, Indonesian, Persian, Pushtu, Russian, Sinhala, Swahili, Thai, Tibetan and English (General Overseas Service). The Indian languages are Bengali, Gujarati, Marathi, Konkani, Kashmiri, Hindi, Kannada, Malayalam, Nepali, Punjabi, Saraiki, Sindhi, Tamil, Telugu and Urdu.

The longest daily broadcast is the Urdu Service to Pakistan, around the clock on DTH (direct-broadcast satellite) and on short- and medium wave for 12 hrs. The English-language General Overseas Service is broadcast 8 hours daily. During Hajj, there are special broadcasts beamed to Saudi Arabia in Urdu. AIR is planning to produce programmes in the Baluchi language.

The external services of AIR are also broadcast to Europe in DRM (Digital Radio Mondiale) on 9950 kHz between 1745 and 2230 UTC. These external transmissions are broadcast by high-power transmitters located at Aligarh, Bengaluru, Chennai, Delhi, Gorakhpur, Guwahati, Mumbai and Panaji on shortwave and from Jalandhar, Kolkata, Nagpur, Rajkot and Tuticorin on medium wave. Soon All India Radio Amritsar will also start a booster service on the FM band. Some of these transmitters are 1000 kW (1 MW) or 500 kW. Programmes are beamed to different parts of the world except for the Americas and the reception quality is very good in the target areas. In each language service, the program consists of news, commentary, a press review, talks on matters of general or cultural interest, feature programmes, documentaries and music from India and the target region. Most programmes originate at New Broadcasting House on Parliament Street in New Delhi, with a few originating at SPT Bengaluru, Chennai, Hyderabad, Jalandhar, Kolkata, HPT Malad Mumbai, Thiruvananthapuram and Tuticorin.

The External Services Division of AIR is a link between India and rest of the world, especially in countries with Indian emigrants and people of Indian origin. It broadcasts the Indian point of view on matters of national and international importance, and demonstrates the Indian way of life through its programs. QSL cards (which are sought-after by international radio hobbyists) are issued to radio hobbyists by AIR in New Delhi for reception reports of their broadcasts.

Direct-To-Home
Direct-to-home (DTH) service is a satellite broadcast service in which a large number of radio channels are digitally beamed down over a territory from a high-power satellite. AIR broadcasts various national and regional stations available to listen on DD Free Dish. The DTH signals can be received directly at homes using a small-sized dish receiver unit containing a dish antenna installed on a building's rooftop or on a wall facing clear south and one indoors. DTH service is offered on twenty one channels via Insat.

List of DTH channels

National
 Vividh Bharati – Hindi Music Radio
 AIR FM Rainbow India – Hindi & English Music Radio
 AIR FM Gold Delhi – Classic Hindi Music & News Radio
 AIR Live News 24×7 – Hindi & English News Radio
 AIR Urdu – Urdu Entertainment Radio
 Raagam – Indian Classical Music Radio
 Gyan Vani – Hindi & English Educational Radio

Regional
 AIR Assamese
 AIR Bangla
 AIR Gujarati
 AIR Hindi
 AIR Kannada
 AIR Malayalam
 AIR Marathi
 AIR Odia
 AIR Punjabi
 AIR Tamil
 AIR Telugu
 AIR Agartala – Bengali & Kokborok
 AIR Aizawl – Mizo
 AIR Bhopal – Hindi
 AIR Dehradun – Hindi
 AIR Gangtok – Nepali
 AIR Imphal – Manipuri
 AIR Itanagar – Hindi & Nyishi
 AIR Jaipur – Hindi & Rajasthani
 AIR Jammu – Dogri & Hindi
 AIR Kohima – Nagamese & English
 AIR Leh – Ladakhi
 AIR Lucknow – Hindi & Urdu
 AIR North East – Hindi & English
 AIR Panaji - Konkani & Marathi
 AIR Patna – Hindi
 AIR Port Blair - Hindi
 AIR Puducherry - Tamil
 AIR Raipur – Hindi & Chhattisgarhi
 AIR Ranchi – Hindi
 AIR Rohtak – Hindi
 AIR Shillong – Khasi & English
 AIR Shimla – Hindi
 AIR Srinagar – Kashmiri & Urdu
 AIR Vijayawada – Telugu

Online services
 AIR Live News
 KASHMIR ONLINE RADIO
 Vividh Bharati
 FM Gold Delhi
 FM Rainbow Delhi
 AIR Urdu
 Raagam
 AIR Gujarati
 AIR Marathi
 AIR Punjabi
 AIR Malayalam
 AIR Tamil
 AIR Telugu
 AIR Kannada
 AIR Bangla
 AIR Jammu
 AIR Odia
 AIR Assamese
 AIR North East
 FM Tragopan Kohima
 FM Rainbow Goa
 AIR Shimla
 AIR Bhuj
 AIR Indore
 AIR Mysuru
 AIR Jodhpur
 Amrutvarshini
 Vividh Bharati Bengaluru
 FM Rainbow Kannada Kaamaanbilu
 AIR Bengaluru
 Sun City FM Jodhpur
 AIR Pune
 AIR Rohtak
 FM Rainbow Lucknow
 AIR Jabalpur
 AIR Bhopal
 FM Rainbow Mumbai
 FM Gold Mumbai
 Samvadita Mumbai
 AIR Aadilabad
 AIR Jaipur
 AIR Varanasi
 AIR Raipur
 AIR Sangli
 AIR Rajkot
 AIR Nagpur
 AIR Prayagraj
 AIR Patna
 AIR Patiala
 AIR Mhadei Panaji
 AIR Gorakhpur
 AIR Hassan
 AIR Dehradun
 AIR Solapur
 AIR Kota
 AIR Madurai
 AIR Kolhapur
 AIR Suratgarh
 FM Rainbow Visakhapatnam
 AIR Kurnool
 AIR Bikaner
 AIR Kochi
 AIR Calicut
 AIR Mathura
 AIR Agra
 FM Rainbow Vijayawada
 AIR Vijayawada
 AIR Kannur
 FM Ananthapuri
 AIR Lucknow
 AIR Mount Abu
 AIR Dharwad
 AIR Chandigarh
 AIR Chitradurga
 AIR Manjeri
 AIR Aurangabad
 AIR Surat
 AIR Tirupati
 AIR Kodaikanal
 AIR Alwar

Other services

Digital Radio Mondiale 
Details of the Digital Radio Mondiale (DRM) transmissions and frequencies are as follows:

 0130–0230 UTC on 11715 kHz Nepali (Nepal)
 0315–0415 UTC on 15185 kHz Hindi (E. Africa, Mauritius)
 0415–0430 UTC on 15185 kHz Gujarati (E. Africa, Mauritius)
 0430–0530 UTC on 15185 kHz Hindi (E. Africa, Mauritius)
 1300–1500 UTC on 15050 kHz Sinhala (Sri Lanka)
 1615–1715 UTC on 15140 kHz Russian (E. Europe)
 2245–0045 UTC on 11645 GOS-I English (NE Asia)

Above transmissions are in addition to following existing DRM txn's:

 0900–1100 on 6100 Vividh Bharati, DRM NVIS
 1745–1965 UTC on 9950 English (W. Europe)
 1945–2045 UTC on 9950 Hindi (W. Europe)
 2045–2630 UTC on 9950 English (W. Europe)

News-on-phone

All India Radio launched news-on-phone service on 25 February 1998 in New Delhi; it now has service in Chennai, Mumbai, Hyderabad, Indore, Patna and Bangalore. The service is accessible through Subscriber trunk dialling (STD), International Direct Dialing (ISD) and local calls. There are plans to establish the service in 11 additional cities including: Ahmedabad, Bhopal, Guwahati, Gwalior, Jabalpur, Jaipur, Kolkata, Lucknow, Ranchi and Shimla. English and Hindi hourly news bulletins may be heard live. News in MP3 format may be directly played from the site, and filenames are time-stamped. AIR news bulletins are available in nine regional languages: Tamil, Kannada, Gujarati, Bengali, Marathi, North East, Punjabi, Telugu and Urdu.

Documentaries
There is a long tradition of broadcasting documentary features on AIR. There is great interest in radio documentaries, particularly in countries like India, Iran, South Korea and Malaysia. The most prominent broadcaster of English Features was Melville de Mellow, and of Hindi Features, Shiv Sagar Mishra. This format has been revived by AIR producers across India because of its flexibility, its relative low cost to produce, its messaging potential and its creative potential.

Central Drama Unit
AIR's Central Drama Unit (CDU) is responsible for the national broadcast of plays. Plays produced by the CDU are translated and produced by regional stations. Since its inception in the 1960s, the unit has produced more than 1,500 plays, and the CDU houses a repository of old scripts and productions. The National Programme of Plays is broadcast by the CDU on the fourth Thursday of each month at 9.30 pm. Each play included in the National Programme of Plays is produced in 22 Indian languages and broadcast at the same time by all regional and national network stations. The CDU also produces Chain Plays, half-hour dramas broadcast in succession by a chain of stations.

Social Media Cell
The News Service Division's Social Media Cell was established on 20 May 2013 and is responsible for providing AIR news on new media platforms such as websites, Twitter, Facebook, and SMS.

Gallery

See also

 Radio in India
 106.4 FM Radio Gold
 Telugu Radio
 Radio Kashmir
 Telecommunications in India

References

External links

 All India Radio Official web-site
 All India Radio Commercial Broadcasting Service Vividh Bharati On Line
 All India Radio Commercial Broadcasting Service Vividh Bharati On Line 
 All India Radio General Overseas Service / External Services Division
 All India Radio General Overseas Service / External Services Division (English)
 Know India: Radio
 All India Radio (AIR) Station Frequencies (National/International)
 Children's wing of All India Radio

 
International broadcasters
Radio stations in India
Hindi-language radio stations
Tibetan-language radio stations
Public radio
Multilingual broadcasters
Radio stations established in 1936
1936 establishments in India
State media
Radio broadcasting companies of India
Radio stations in Assam